Kristina Prkačin (born 21 October 1997) is a Croatian handball player for RK Lokomotiva Zagreb and the Croatian national team.

She participated at the 2018 European Women's Handball Championship.

International honours
EHF European Cup:
Winner: 2017
Runner-up: 2021

References

External links

1997 births
Living people
Sportspeople from Dubrovnik
Croatian female handball players